The Ultimate Vampire (殭屍至尊) is a 1991 Hong Kong film directed by Andrew Lau and starring Lam Ching-ying and Chin Siu-ho. It is a spin-off of the 1985 Hong Kong movie Mr. Vampire, Lam Ching-ying reprises his role as a Taoist priest.

Plot
Master Gau's (Lam Ching-ying) village get overtaken by vampires, so Master Gau and his assistants must join forces to rid their village of the vampires. Master Gau must also take care of his assistants who befriend a ghost.

Box office
The Ultimate Vampire ran 1 January 1991 - 11 January 1991 and grossed HK$6,631,216.00 at the box office.

Cast
Lam Ching-ying as Master Gau
Chin Siu-ho as Chou Sheng
Ronald Wong as Man Choi
Carrie Ng as Lai
Shun Lau as Master Shek Kin
Chi Yeung Wong	as Shek Shiu Kin
Feng Ku as Chin
Joanna Chan as Mary

References

External links

The Ultimate Vampire at Hong Kong Cinemagic

1991 films
Films directed by Andrew Lau
Hong Kong action films
1990s monster movies
Hong Kong martial arts films
1991 action comedy films
Jiangshi films
1990s comedy horror films
Mr. Vampire
Vampire comedy films
1990s Hong Kong films